Grayson Hall (September 18, 1922 – August 7, 1985) was an American television, film and stage actress. She was widely regarded for her avant-garde theatrical performances from the 1960s to the 1980s. Hall was nominated for an Academy Award for Best Supporting Actress and a Golden Globe Award for the John Huston film The Night of the Iguana (1964).

Hall played multiple prominent roles on the gothic soap opera Dark Shadows (1966–71) and appeared on One Life to Live (1982–83). In 2006, a biography titled Grayson Hall: A Hard Act to Follow was released.

Early life
Hall was born Shirley Grossman in Philadelphia in 1922, the only child of Eleanor and Joseph Grossman. Her father was from Latvia and her mother, who had acted in the Yiddish theatre, was from South Africa. Both were from Jewish immigrant families.

When Hall was eight, her parents separated, but they never divorced. Hall became interested in acting as an escape from a painful childhood, and auditioned for plays in New York City while still attending Simon Gratz High School in North Philadelphia. She enrolled at Temple University but did not matriculate. She landed her first professional job with a summer stock company on Long Island in 1942.

In 1946, she married fellow actor Ted Brooks in Philadelphia. They separated in 1949 and she returned to New York. In 1952, she married writer Sam Hall. Their son Matthew was born in 1958. She had always used the stage name Shirley Grayson, but Sam Hall called her Grayson "like an old Army buddy," as she said in an interview. She eventually adopted Grayson Hall as her professional name.

Career
Hall enjoyed an active stage career in New York City. Her theater credits include roles in off-Broadway productions of influential avant-garde plays including Six Characters in Search of an Author by Luigi Pirandello (Phoenix Theatre, 1955). She also appeared as the madam Irma in the first New York production of The Balcony by Jean Genet for more than a year at the Circle in the Square Theatre Downtown in Greenwich Village.

Having guest-starred on various television programs during the mid-1950s, Hall made her film debut in 1961 in Run Across the River. She also appeared in Satan in High Heels as a cabaret club owner, but she later disavowed the film.

In September 1963, Hall traveled to Puerto Vallarta, Mexico to play the role of Judith Fellowes in John Huston's film version of The Night of the Iguana, based on the original play by Tennessee Williams. She was nominated for an Academy Award in the category of Best Supporting Actress for her performance.

Hall portrayed a kidnapped bank teller in Walt Disney Productions' That Darn Cat! in 1965. She appeared on an episode of The Man from U.N.C.L.E. in 1967.

Dark Shadows
Hall's best-known television role was as Dr. Julia Hoffman on Dark Shadows. She portrayed the loyal confidant and friend of the vampire Barnabas Collins (Jonathan Frid). Other key roles that she played on the show were those of Countess Natalie Dupres; Magda Rakosi, a Gypsy; Hoffman, a Mrs. Danvers-type housekeeper; Julia Collins; and Constance Collins, sister of Brutus Collins.  She also appeared in both Dark Shadows feature films: in House of Dark Shadows again as Dr. Julia Hoffman, and in Night of Dark Shadows as a new character, housekeeper Carlotta Drake.

Later career
After Dark Shadows ended, Hall portrayed reporter Marge Grey on All My Children for a short period in 1973. She continued acting on stage in Jean Genet's The Screens (1971–72) and in Happy End (1977) with Meryl Streep and Christopher Lloyd.

In the 1970s, Hall appeared on several television films, including Gargoyles (ABC), filmed in New Mexico with Cornel Wilde, and the Dan Curtis television film The Great Ice Rip-Off (ABC) with Lee J. Cobb and Gig Young. She starred in the mystery film The Two Deaths of Sean Doolittle (ABC), which was written by her husband Sam Hall.

Hall appeared in the Broadway premiere of The Suicide (1980) with Derek Jacobi and appeared opposite Geraldine Page, Carrie Nye and Madeleine Sherwood in an off-Broadway revival of The Madwoman of Chaillot.

Her last onscreen role was as Euphemia Ralston (Delila's scheming mother) on the soap opera One Life to Live from July 1982 until April 1983.

Death
After a six-month battle with lung cancer, Hall died at New York Hospital in Manhattan in 1985 at the age of 62.  A simple marker near her Rhinebeck, New York home reads "Grayson Hall — August 7, 1985."

Selected filmography

References

Further reading
  Hamrick, Craig & Jamison, R. J. Barnabas & Company: The Cast of the TV Classic Dark Shadows (revised 2012) iUniverse, amazon.com; accessed October 31, 2012.

External links
Grayson Hall official website
 
 
 

1922 births
1985 deaths
20th-century American actresses
20th-century American Jews
Actresses from New York (state)
Actresses from Philadelphia
American film actresses
American people of Latvian-Jewish descent
American people of South African-Jewish descent
American soap opera actresses
American stage actresses
Broadway theatre people 
Deaths from lung cancer in New York (state)
Jewish American actresses
 Off-Broadway
People from Rhinebeck, New York